IROC XIX was the nineteenth year of IROC competition, which took place in 1995. It was the second and final year the Dodge Avenger was used in competition, and continued the format introduced in IROC XVIII. Race one took place on the Daytona International Speedway, race two took place at Darlington Raceway, race three ran at Talladega Superspeedway, and the year finished at Michigan International Speedway. Dale Earnhardt won his second series championship and $225,000.

The roster of drivers and final points standings were as follows:

Race results

Race One, Daytona International Speedway
Friday, February 17, 1995

one *: Bonus points for leading the most laps.two **: Bonus points for leading the 2nd most laps.three ***: Bonus points for leading the 3rd most laps.

Average speed: 180.723 mphCautions: noneMargin of victory: 2 clLead changes: 14

Race Two, Darlington Raceway
Saturday, March 25, 1995

one *: Bonus points for leading the most laps.two **: Bonus points for leading the 2nd most laps.three ***: Bonus points for leading the 3rd most laps.

Average speed: 153.675 mphCautions: 1Margin of victory: .66 secLead changes: 1

Cautions

Race Three, Talladega Superspeedway
Saturday, April 29, 1995

one *: Bonus points for leading the most laps.two **: Bonus points for leading the 2nd most laps.three ***: Bonus points for leading the 3rd most laps.

Average speed: 187.474 mphCautions: noneMargin of victory: .5 clLead changes: 13

Lap Leader Breakdown

Race Four, Michigan International Speedway
Saturday, July 29, 1995

one *: Bonus points for leading the most laps.two **: Bonus points for leading the 2nd most laps.three ***: Bonus points for leading the 3rd most laps.

Average speed: 166.764 mphCautions: 1 (Lap 3, Scott Pruett spin turn 2)Margin of victory: .112 secLead changes: 5

Notes
 Al Unser Jr. and Steve Kinser tied for 7th place in the final championship standings; Unser Jr. was awarded the position due to a higher finishing position in the final race.
 Al Unser Jr. did not start races two and three due to injury
 Steve Millen did not compete in race four due to injury

References

External links
IROC XIX History - IROC Website

International Race of Champions
1995 in American motorsport